Shumuling station is an interchange station for Line 4 and Changsha–Zhuzhou–Xiangtan intercity railway of the Changsha subway.

China Railway

Shumuling station is a railway station in Yuhua District, Changsha, Hunan, China, operated by CR Guangzhou. It opened its services on 26 December 2016. Shumuling station offers interchange to the Changsha Metro Line 4.

Changsha Metro

Shumuling station is a subway station in Yuhua District, Changsha, Hunan, China, operated by the Changsha subway operator Changsha Metro.

Station layout
The station has one island platform.

History
The station was completed in September 2017. The station opened on 26 May 2019.

Surrounding area
 Shumuling School
 Ziranling School
 Hunan Industrial and Trade School 
 Changsha Hydrological and Water Resources Survey Bureau

References

Railway stations in Hunan
Railway stations in China opened in 2019